The following is a list of notable events and releases that happened or are expected to happen in 2010 in New Zealand music.

Events

January
 15 January: Big Day Out (see lineup)
 29 January – 1 February: Parachute music festival (see lineup)

May
 1 May: Music television channel C42 launches, aiming to play 30% New Zealand music

Albums released

March
 15 March: Humour and the Misfortune of Others by Hollie Smith
 17 March: My Own Way by Darren Ross
 29 March: The Experiment by Dane Rumble

April
 5 April: Love in Motion by Anika Moa

June
 11 June: Intriguer by Crowded House
 14 June: Live at Roundhouse by Fat Freddy's Drop

July
 4 July: Modern Fables by Julia Deans
 5 July: Evolution - Past, Present, Beyond by Deceptikonz

August
 2 August: Until the End of Time by Opshop
 20 August: From the Inside Out by Stan Walker
 23 August: Beheaded Ouroboros by Witchrist
 Passive Me, Aggressive You by The Naked and Famous

September
 20 September: Ignite by Shihad

October
 4 October: Perfect Flaws by Black River Drive
 11 October: 5th Degree by Autozamm

November
 30 November: DARREN! by Darren Ross

Awards
New Zealand Music Awards

The winners of the 2010 New Zealand Music Awards, or 'Tuis', will be announced on 7 October.

Number-ones in 2010
Record charts in New Zealand are published by the Recording Industry Association of New Zealand every week.

Singles

The longest running number-one single in 2010 so far is Stan Walker's "Black Box", topping the chart for six consecutive weeks of 2010.

Albums

Susan Boyle's I Dreamed a Dream was the number-one album for six non-consecutive weeks of 2010.

Compilations

Now That's What I Call Music 32 (N.Z. series) remained as the number-one compilation album for twelve non-consecutive weeks of 2010.

Music DVDs

André Rieu's Live in Sydney 2009 has reached the top spot in 2010 for five non-consecutive weeks.

Radio airplays

"Black Box" by Stan Walker was the most-played on New Zealand radio stations for nine consecutive weeks of 2010.

References

 
Music